WrestleWar was a professional wrestling pay-per-view event series promoted by World Championship Wrestling (WCW). It was held in May in 1989 and 1992 and February in 1990 and 1991. The first two events were promoted under the National Wrestling Alliance banner, the final two under the WCW name. The final two events also featured the WarGames match, which had previously been held during The Great American Bash and continued to be held at other events following the cancellation of this pay-per-view.

In 1993, WCW held SuperBrawl III in February and the first ever Slamboree show in May, which replaced the WrestleWar show on the schedule from that point until WCW closed in 2001. After WCW closed all rights to their television and PPV shows were bought by WWE, including the WrestleWar shows. With the launch of the WWE Network in 2014 all WrestleWar shows became available on demand for network subscribers.

Dates, venues, and main events

References

 
Recurring events established in 1989
Recurring events disestablished in 1992